Secret Passion is the seventh studio album by French singer Amanda Lear, released by Carrere Records in 1986.

Background
Secret Passion was Amanda's first full-length studio album after her departure from Ariola Records. It was recorded in Stefana Studios in Los Angeles and Hollywood Studios in Rome with mostly American composers, musicians and arrangers. Contrary to previous albums, Amanda had little input into songwriting and composing, with minor contributions in only three songs. The material showcased a danceable synthpop sound produced by Christian De Walden with Steve Singer. Secret Passion was released by Carrere Records, a major label in Francophone countries like France, Belgium, Switzerland and Canada in the 1970s and 1980s.

"Les Femmes", a French-language version of "She Wolf", was released as the lead single in 1986. A cover of The Troggs' "Wild Thing" and "Time's Up" were released in early 1987, the latter only in the United Kingdom. "Aphrodisiac" was re-recorded in French and re-titled "Aphrodisiaque" for its release as a single exclusively in France. During the album's recording sessions, an updated dance version of Lear's signature tune "Follow Me" was recorded, and subsequently released as a single to promote Secret Passion, although it was not included on the album. Despite frequent television performances, none of the singles managed to chart.

The album was not only intended to be a European comeback for Amanda Lear, after a few years of working primarily as a successful TV presenter, but also a serious attempt to launch her career in English-speaking countries like the USA, Canada and the United Kingdom as well. However, as she was getting ready to start promoting Secret Passion, Lear was seriously injured in a near fatal car crash. She had to spend months in convalescence and was unable to promote the album. As a result, it did not fare as well commercially as had been hoped and planned for.

While the album has not had a CD release as such, tracks have surfaced on a number of compilations licensed by Siebenpunkts Verlag Gmbh/ZYX Music/Mint Records over the years and all eight songs have appeared on compilations I'm a Mistery – The Whole Story (2001) and Living Legend (2003).

Track listing
Side A
 "Desire" (Cale Roberts, Frank Anselmo) – 4:18
 "Wild Thing" (Chip Taylor) – 3:36
 "I Want My Name on a Billboard" (Steve Singer, Margaret Harris, Peter Van Asten, Richard DeBois) – 4:25
 "She Wolf" (Madelynn Von Ritz, Gary M. Johnson) – 4:17

Side B
 "Mannequin" (Michael Price, Amanda Lear) – 3:32
 "I'm a Mistery" (Seraphim, Amanda Lear, Roland Vincent) – 4:35
 "Aphrodisiac" (Mike Stepstone, Steve Singer, Amanda Lear, Lenny Macaluso) – 3:44
 "Time's Up" (Mara Cubeddu, Michael Bernard, Bob Esty) – 4:55

Personnel

Amanda Lear – lead vocals
Rocco Barocco – dress
Rick Braun – trumpet
Kim Bullard – synthesizers
Charlie Cannon – backing vocals
Frank Castiglia – backing vocals
Claude Caudron – artwork
Rosie D'Andrea – backing vocals
Christian De Walden – record producer, musical and vocal arranger, executive producer, mixing
Stacey Dunne – backing vocals
Michael Fisher – percussion
Denny Fongheiser – drums
Kiko Fusco – sound engineer
Brian Gardner – mastering
John Inglodsby – assistant sound engineer
Marco Manusso – guitar
Maurizio Mariani – assistant sound engineer

Carlo Mezzano – executive producer
Victoria Miller – backing vocals
Doug Norwine – saxophone
Carol Parks – backing vocals, vocal arranger
Dean Parks – guitar
Bob Parr – bass guitar
John C. Parr – guitar
Greg Penny – sound engineer, mixing
Leslie Perkins – backing vocals
Eddiy Petrolati – assistant sound engineer
Michael Price – synthesizers
Debbie Rider – backing vocals
Annie Robert – backing vocals
Roberto Rocchi – cover photo
Denise Rosner – backing vocals
Tom Walsh – drums
Joe Seta – sound engineer
Steve Singer – record producer, musical arranger, executive producer, synthesizers

Release history

References

External links
 Secret Passion at Discogs
 Secret Passion at Rate Your Music

1986 albums
Amanda Lear albums